Ernestina Edem Appiah (born 1977) is a Ghanaian social entrepreneur. She founded the Ghana Code Club as an after-school program to teach children how to write computer programs. She made the "BBC 100 Most Inspirational Women" list in 2015.

Biography 
Ernestina Edem Appiah was born in 1977. She was selected among the British Broadcasting Corporation list of most inspirational women in 2015, the only Ghanaian woman to have made the list in that year. She founded the Ghana Code Club as a non governmental social enterprise that "teaches children computer programming skills" by working with Information and Communications Technology teachers in basic schools to develop programs that can enable the teachers teach children how to "make computer games, animations and websites".

Ernestina is a Virtual Assistant by training and at a point had her own virtual assistance business. She founded her first NGO in 2007, Healthy Career Initiative as a means of sharing and mentoring girls in ICT. This gave rise to the foundations of the Ghana Code Club.

References

1973 births
Living people
Ghanaian educators
BBC 100 Women